Zlatomir Šuvački (born November 26, 1945) is a Yugoslav sprint canoer who competed in the late 1960s and early 1970s. At the 1968 Summer Olympics in Mexico City, he was eliminated in the semifinals of K-2 1000 m event. Four years later in Munich, Šuvački was eliminated in the semifinals of the K-4 1000 m event.

References
Sports-reference.com profile

1945 births
Canoeists at the 1968 Summer Olympics
Canoeists at the 1972 Summer Olympics
Living people
Olympic canoeists of Yugoslavia
Yugoslav male canoeists
Serbian male canoeists